Jawahar Navodaya Vidyalaya, Jaffarpur Kalan or locally known as JNV Jaffarpur Kalan is a boarding, co-educational school located in South West district of Delhi in India. Navodaya Vidyalayas are funded by the Indian Ministry of Education and administered by Navodaya Vidyalaya Smiti, an autonomous body under the ministry.

History 
The school was established in 1991, and is a part of Jawahar Navodaya Vidyalaya schools, which provide free boarding and education to gifted students. This school is administered and monitored by Jaipur regional office of Navodaya Vidyalaya Smiti.

Admission 
Admission to JNV Jaffarpur Kalan at class VI level is made through selection test (JNVST) conducted by Navodaya Vidyalaya Smiti.
Admission to JNV Jaffarpur Kalan at class IX level is made conducted by Navodaya Vidyalaya Smiti.

Affiliations 
JNV Jaffarpur Kalan is affiliated to Central Board of Secondary Education with affiliation number 2740002.

Location 
It is located in a remote village named Jaffarpur kalan, New Delhi. This village is also famous for the home of Chaudhary Brhmaprakash, who is first chief minister of Delhi.
 Nearest railway station - Delhi Cantonment
 Nearest airport- Indira Gandhi International Airport
Nearest hospital- Rao Tularam Memorial Hospital

See also 
 Jawahar Navodaya Vidyalaya, Mungeshpur
 List of JNV schools

References

External links 

 Official Website of JNV South West district, Delhi

High schools and secondary schools in Delhi
Jawahar Navodaya Vidyalayas in Delhi
Educational institutions established in 1991
1991 establishments in Delhi